Academic grading in Kenya is the grading system of Kenya.

Secondary school 
In Kenya, the grading system varies according to overall performance of candidates in the national exam called Kenya Certificate of Secondary Education (KCSE).

All grade thresholds change per year according to the intensity of the exam. As of 2019 Examinations, The highest Mean Grade (A) equated to the percentage of  81+. Although below is the Standard Grading System that is implemented as a base for all series of the examination.  
 

Examinees are awarded an overall grade for the subjects examined. Students sit for 7, 8, or 9 subjects, but the overall grade and points are calculated from 7 subjects, as follows:
 Three courses from Group 1: 101 English, 102 Kiswahili and 121 Mathematics are required
 Two courses from Group 2: Biology, Physics, and Chemistry
 One course from Group 3: History and Government, Geography, CRE/IRE/HRE
 An additional course not among those mentioned above

Undergraduate Degree 
Undergraduate degree grading system in Kenya is summarized by the table below:

References

Kenya
Grading
Grading